Shakori may refer to:

Shakori Tribe a Native American Indian tribe.
Shakori Hills Grassroots Festival a music festival in North Carolina.